Phaneropora is a genus of brachiopods belonging to the family Platidiidae.

Species:

Phaneropora galatheae 
Phaneropora ignota

References

Brachiopod genera